Shin Young-kyun (born November 6, 1928) is a South Korean actor, film producer, and politician.

Biography
Shin Young-kyun was born in Pyongsan, Hwanghae Province (now part of North Korea) in 1928. When he was 10 years old, Shin went to Seoul. While studying dentistry at Seoul National University, he participated in a drama club where he got to know Park Am, Gil Yok-yun, and Lee Nak-hoon, who later became actors and composer.

Filmography
*Note; the whole list is referenced.

Planner

Producer

Awards
 1962 1st Grand Bell Awards: Best Actor for Prince Yeonsan
 1963 2nd Grand Bell Awards: Best Actor for The Memorial Gate for Virtuous Women
 1964 2nd Blue Dragon Film Awards: Favorite Actor
 1965 4th Grand Bell Awards: Best Actor for Princess Dalgi
 1965 3rd Blue Dragon Film Awards: Favorite Actor
 1966 4th Blue Dragon Film Awards: Best Actor for The Market Place
 1965 2nd Baeksang Arts Awards: Best Film Actor
 1965 4th Blue Dragon Film Awards: Favorite Actor
 1969 5th Baeksang Arts Awards: Favorite Film Actor for Prince Daewon
 1970 6th Baeksang Arts Awards: Favorite Film Actor
 1972 8th Baeksang Arts Awards: Favorite Film Actor
 2007 44th Grand Bell Awards: Special Achievement Award
 2008 7th Korean Film Awards: Special Achievement Award
 2010 47th Grand Bell Awards: Special Award

References

External links
 

1928 births
Living people
South Korean male film actors
Seoul National University alumni
People from North Hwanghae
Sin clan of Pyongsan